71 members of the New Zealand House of Representatives were elected in the general election on 20 September 2014.

General electorates

Auckland Central

|-
!colspan=6|Withdrawn candidates and retiring MPs
|-

|}

Bay of Plenty

|-
!colspan=6|Withdrawn candidates and retiring MPs
|-

|}

Botany

|-
!colspan=6|Withdrawn candidates and retiring MPs
|-

|}

Christchurch Central

|-
!colspan=6|Withdrawn candidates and retiring MPs
|-

|}

Christchurch East

|-
!colspan=6|Withdrawn candidates and retiring MPs
|-

|}

Clutha-Southland

|-
!colspan=6|Withdrawn candidates and retiring MPs
|-

|}

Coromandel

|}

Dunedin North

|}

Dunedin South

|}

East Coast

|}

East Coast Bays

|-
!colspan=6|Withdrawn candidates and retiring MPs
|-

|}

Epsom

|-
!colspan=6|Withdrawn candidates and retiring MPs
|-

|}

Hamilton East

|}

Hamilton West

|-
!colspan=6|Withdrawn candidates and retiring MPs
|-

|}

Helensville

|}

Hunua

|-
!colspan=6|Withdrawn candidates and retiring MPs
|-

|}

Hutt South

|}

Ilam

|}

Invercargill

|-
!colspan=6|Withdrawn candidates and retiring MPs
|-

|}

Kaikōura

|-
!colspan=6|Withdrawn candidates and retiring MPs
|-

|}

Kelston

|-
!colspan=6|Withdrawn candidates
|-

|}

Mana

|}

Māngere

|}

Manukau East

|-
!colspan=6|Withdrawn candidates and retiring MPs
|-

|}

Manurewa

|}

Maungakiekie

|}

Mount Albert

|}

Mount Roskill

|}

Napier

|-
!colspan=6|Withdrawn candidates and retiring MPs
|-

|}

Nelson

|-
!colspan=6|Withdrawn candidates and retiring MPs
|-

|}

New Lynn

|}

New Plymouth

|}

North Shore

|}

Northcote

|}

Northland

|}

Ōhāriu

 
|}

Ōtaki

|}

Pakuranga

|}

Palmerston North

|}

Papakura

|}

Port Hills

|}

Rangitata

|}

Rangitīkei

|}

Rimutaka

|}

Rodney

|}

Rongotai

|-
!colspan=6|Withdrawn candidates and retiring MPs
|-

|}

Rotorua

|}

Selwyn

|}

Tāmaki

|}

Taranaki-King Country

|-
!colspan=6|Withdrawn candidates and retiring MPs
|-

|}

Taupō

|}

Tauranga

|}

Te Atatū

|}

Tukituki

|}

Upper Harbour

|}

Waikato

|}

Waimakariri

|-
!colspan=6|Withdrawn candidates and retiring MPs
|-

|}

Wairarapa

|-
!colspan=6|Withdrawn candidates and retiring MPs
|-

|}

Waitaki

|}

Wellington Central

|}

West Coast-Tasman

|}

Whanganui

|}

Whangarei

|-
!colspan=6|Withdrawn candidates and retiring MPs
|-

|}

Wigram

|}

Māori electorates

Hauraki-Waikato

|}

Ikaroa-Rāwhiti

|}

Tāmaki Makaurau

|-
!colspan=6|Withdrawn candidates and retiring MPs
|-

|}

Te Tai Hauāuru

|-
!colspan=6|Withdrawn candidates and retiring MPs
|-

|}

Te Tai Tokerau

|}

Te Tai Tonga

|}

Waiariki

|}

References

2014 New Zealand general election
Candidates 2014